Joseph Burl Davidson (January 24, 1903 – May 14, 1982) was an American football player. He played college football for Colgate and Oklahoma State and in the National Football League (NFL) as a back for the Chicago Cardinals (1928) and Newark Tornadoes (1930). He appeared in 12 NFL games, eight as a starter.

References

1903 births
1982 deaths
Colgate Raiders football players
Oklahoma State Cowboys football players
Chicago Cardinals players
Newark Tornadoes players
Players of American football from Michigan
American football guards
People from Durand, Michigan
American football centers